Da'Ron Brown (born September 21, 1991) is a former American football wide receiver. He played college football at Northern Illinois.

Professional career

Kansas City Chiefs
He was drafted by the Kansas City Chiefs in the seventh round of the 2015 NFL Draft. He spent the entire 2015 season on the practice squad and was signed to a reserve/futures contract at the end of the season. On September 3, 2016, he was released by the Chiefs.

New England Patriots
On September 27, 2016, Brown was signed to the Patriots' practice squad. He was released by the Patriots on October 1, 2016.

New York Giants
On November 9, 2016, Brown was signed to the Giants practice squad. He was released by the Giants on November 17, 2016.

Miami Dolphins
On December 1, 2016, Brown was signed to the Dolphins practice squad.

Los Angeles Chargers
On January 19, 2017, Brown signed a futures contract with the Los Angeles Chargers. He was waived on September 2, 2017.

References

External links
Northern Illinois Huskies bio 

1991 births
Living people
Players of American football from Chicago
American football wide receivers
Northern Illinois Huskies football players
Kansas City Chiefs players
New England Patriots players
New York Giants players
Miami Dolphins players
Los Angeles Chargers players